XIV Riigikogu is the fourteenth and current legislature of the Estonian Parliament (Riigikogu). The legislature was elected after 2019 election.

Election results

Officers
Speaker of the Riigikogu: Henn Põlluaas.

List of members of the Riigikogu

Current composition
This list consists of current members of the Estonian Parliament.

References 

Riigikogu
Riigikogu